Bogdan Gheorghe Stelea (born 5 December 1967) is a Romanian retired footballer who played as a goalkeeper, and a current coach.

Having played professionally into his 40s, he played for all three major Liga I clubs in his country's capital, and also spent a vast part of his career in Spain, mainly with Salamanca, also Stelea played nearly 100 times for Romania, and represented the nation in three World Cups and two European Championships.

Club career
Bogdan Stelea was born in Bucharest on 5 December 1967 and he started to play football at the age of 12 when he was brought by boxing coach, Dumitru Ion at the youth center of Dinamo București where he worked with Iosif Varga, also during his youth years he was teammate with future national team competitor, Florin Prunea. He made his Liga I debut on 20 November 1986 under coach Mircea Lucescu in a 2–0 victory against Oțelul Galați but shortly afterwards he was sent on loan for the second half of the season at Politehnica Iași where he did not made any appearances. Stelea returned under Lucescu's command at Dinamo, being the first choice for the goalkeeper position since 1988, replacing Dumitru Moraru and his first performance with the team was reaching the quarter-finals of the 1988–89 European Cup Winners' Cup where they were eliminated on the away goals rule after 1–1 on aggregate by Sampdoria and in the following season he helped the club win The Double and appeared in 8 matches from the 1989–90 European Cup Winners' Cup campaign when the team reached the semi-finals where they were eliminated after 2–0 on aggregate by Anderlecht. While he was in a cantonment before a game from the 1990–91 European Cup against Porto, Stelea was nicknamed Arnold by Corneliu Vadim Tudor who visited them because his haircut looked similar to the one of Arnold Schwarzenegger from the movie Red Heat. In 1991–92 he was used by coach Florin Halagian in 11 Liga I games as the capital side won the national championship and eliminated with a 2–1 victory on aggregate Luis Figo's Sporting Lisabona in the UEFA Cup, but was transferred late in 1991 to Mallorca for €300.000. After two seasons in Spain, with relegation in his first, he joined Belgium's Standard Liège where he was teammate with fellow Romanian, Mircea Rednic but because he did not play much and risked not being selected to be part of Romania's 1994 World Cup squad, he quickly returned home to play for a half of year at Rapid București. After he participated at the 1994 World Cup, Stelea went to play for one year in Turkey at Samsunspor along compatriots Marius Cheregi and Daniel Timofte, being brought there by coach Gheorghe Mulțescu as first choice goalkeeper. Afterwards, Stelea returned again to his country and joined Steaua București, where in his two-year spell at the club, under the guidance of coach Dumitru Dumitriu he helped it renew its domestic supremacy by contributing significantly to the winning of The Double in both seasons and he played 11 games in the Champions League group stage over the course of the two seasons, also he kept a clean sheet in the victory from the 1995 Supercupa României in front of Petrolul Ploiești and during this period he also had a successful trial with Sunderland, but could not negotiate a deal. In 1997, Stelea was transferred to UD Salamanca for €900.000, where he lived his most steady period, remaining with the team seven years, only punctuated by a small loan spell with Rapid in which he was used by coach Mircea Rednic in the 2–1 victory against Dinamo from the 2002 Cupa României Final, he appeared in 191 overall games for Los Charros during his tenure whilst competing mainly in the second division, but spent his first two seasons in the top flight, also he was colleague with fellow Romanians Cătălin Munteanu, Lucian Marinescu, Ovidiu Stîngă and Gabriel Popescu which gave the club the nickname "Salamanca Rumana". In 2004, Stelea returned at Dinamo, helping the club win the 2004–05 Cupa României, being used by coach Ioan Andone in the final where he kept a clean sheet in the victory in front of Farul Constanța. In 2005 he was brought in Greece at Akratitos together with Lucian Marinescu by his former national team colleague Ilie Dumitrescu who was coach. In 2006, Stelea went back to Romania, signing with Oțelul Galați where he spent half of season, but did not feature in any matches because of a serious injury. The following campaign he moved to Unirea Urziceni for two seasons, being coached by his former national team colleague Dan Petrescu, but only in the second season he became first choice. Bogdan Stelea finally ended his 23-year long career at age 41 by the end of the 2008–09 season, playing 23 matches under coach Răzvan Lucescu at FC Brașov.

International career
Bogdan Stelea played 91 games in which he conceded 72 goals at international level for Romania, making his debut on 23 November 1988 when coach Emerich Jenei sent him on the field to replace Silviu Lung for the last 20 minutes of a 3–0 victory in a friendly against Israel. His second game was a 1–0 victory against Bulgaria at the successful 1990 World Cup qualifiers, being selected by coach Jenei to be part of the squad that went at the final tournament, however he was not used in any games. He played one game at the Euro 1992 qualifiers, made 6 appearances at the successful 1994 World Cup qualifiers, being part of the "Golden Generation" that reached the quarter-finals of the final tournament, but he was used by coach Anghel Iordănescu in only two games from the group stage, a 3–1 victory against Colombia and a 4–1 loss against Switzerland, as Florin Prunea was chosen to play in the other three games of the campaign. He played 10 games at the successful Euro 1996 qualifiers, being used by Iordănescu in two 1–0 losses against France and Bulgaria as Romania did not pass the group of the final tournament. He played 8 games at the successful 1998 World Cup qualifiers, being used by Iordănescu in all the minutes of the four games from the final tournament as the team reached the sixteenths-finals where they were eliminated after a 1–0 loss in front of Croatia and went on to play 7 games at the successful Euro 2000 qualifiers, being used by coach Jenei in all the minutes of the four games from the final tournament as they reached the quarter-finals where they were defeated with 2–0 by Italy. In his final years of activity at the national team, Stelea went on to play 7 games at the 2002 World Cup qualifiers including appearing in the lost play-off against Slovenia, made one appearance at the Euro 2004 qualifiers in a 3–0 victory against Bosnia and Herzegovina, he was the team's captain for the first and only time in his career in a 1–1 against Armenia in which he had a very appreciated evolution and made his final appearance on 9 February 2005 in a friendly which ended 2–2 in front of Slovakia.

For representing his country during 1990–2000 at the World and European Cups final tournaments, Stelea was decorated by President of Romania Traian Băsescu on 25 March 2008 with the Ordinul "Meritul Sportiv" – (The Medal "The Sportive Merit") class III.

Controversy
On 3 June 1998, during a friendly against Paraguay, played on the Ghencea stadium, Stelea was booed by the fans after he conceded a goal by Roberto Acuña and in response he made some obscene gestures towards them, later he said that he did that because he had a moment of weakness as his child was in the hospital, being very sick at that moment. In 2001, he had a fight with the striker Ionel Ganea in a training session that took part before a Romania – Italy game.

Managerial career
Bogdan Stelea started his coaching career in 2009, shortly after he retired when he worked as an assistant at Romania's national team of Răzvan Lucescu, his coach from the last club he played for, FC Brașov. On 6 June 2012, Stelea became head coach of Astra Ploiești, however two months later after a home draw against CS Turnu Severin, he was sacked and replaced with Gheorghe Mulțescu. Afterwards he went to coach for a year Romania's under-21 national team from 2013 until 2014. In June 2014, Stelea accepted an offer from his former national team colleague, Gheorghe Hagi to coach his club Viitorul Constanța but resigned after not obtaining any victory in the first four rounds of the season.

Personal life
His son, Bogdan Ionuț Stelea was also a footballer, he played as a defender and spent his career in the lower leagues of Romania playing for teams like FC Snagov or Chindia Târgoviște.

Career statistics

Club

International

Honours
Dinamo București
Liga I: 1989–90, 1991–92
Cupa României: 1989–90, 2004–05
Steaua București
Liga I: 1995–96, 1996–97
Cupa României: 1995–96, 1996–97
Supercupa României: 1995
Rapid București
Cupa României: 2001–02

References

External links

1967 births
Living people
Footballers from Bucharest
Romanian footballers
Association football goalkeepers
Liga I players
FC Dinamo București players
FC Politehnica Iași (1945) players
FC Rapid București players
FC Steaua București players
ASC Oțelul Galați players
FC Unirea Urziceni players
FC Brașov (1936) players
La Liga players
Segunda División players
RCD Mallorca players
UD Salamanca players
Belgian Pro League players
Standard Liège players
Süper Lig players
Samsunspor footballers
Super League Greece players
A.P.O. Akratitos Ano Liosia players
Romania international footballers
1990 FIFA World Cup players
1994 FIFA World Cup players
1998 FIFA World Cup players
UEFA Euro 1996 players
UEFA Euro 2000 players
Romanian expatriate footballers
Expatriate footballers in Spain
Expatriate footballers in Belgium
Expatriate footballers in Turkey
Expatriate footballers in Greece
Romanian expatriate sportspeople in Spain
Romanian football managers
FC Astra Giurgiu managers
FC Viitorul Constanţa managers